The women's 400 metres T37 event at the 2020 Summer Paralympics in Tokyo, took place on 31 August 2021.

Records
Prior to the competition, the existing records were as follows:

Results
The final took place on 31 August 2021, at 21:45:

References

Women's 400 metres T37
2021 in women's athletics